Hakea carinata is a shrub in the family Proteaceae native to an area in South Australia.  A frost hardy small to medium species adaptable to a range of free draining situations. Its prickly habit creates a good wildlife habitat.

Description
Smaller branches are covered with flattened fine hairs at flowering, sometimes smooth. The single inflorescence consists of 8-24 cream-white flowers and appear in the leaf axils. The pink pedicels are smooth, sometimes with thinly sparsed silky hairs. Flowers from in spring from September to October.

Taxonomy and naming
Hakea carinata was first formally described in 1854 by the botanist Carl Meissner who published the description in the journal Linnaea. The specific epithet (carinata) is a Latin word meaning "keeled", possibly referring to the leaves of this species, being triangular or boat-shaped in cross-section.

Distribution and habitat
This hakea has a scattered distribution in southern parts of the Flinders Range and the Mount Lofty Ranges. A couple of isolated populations are also found in the southeast of the state around Padthaway. The species is often part of the understorey of dry sclerophyll forest and is also found among scrub-heath communities growing in sandy to loamy soils.

References

carinata
Flora of South Australia
Taxa named by Carl Meissner
Plants described in 1854
Taxa named by Ferdinand von Mueller